The Life of Despot Stefan Lazarević is a biography of Serbian ruler Stefan Lazarević authored by Constantine of Kostenets ("the Philosopher") ca. 1431. The biography had been ordered by Serbian Patriarch Nikon following the death of Despot Stefan. That order was only fulfilled four years later, when allegedly Despot Stefan himself appeared in Constantine's dream. The biography is regarded as one of the most interesting in the medieval Serbian literature because it contains not only facts about the Despot's life, but also geographic information and thorough descriptions of numerous historical events. Constantine was apparently inspired by Byzantine chronicles. The work begins with a geographic description of Serbia's natural beauties, going on to describe its residents, praising their character but also mourning their forthcoming fall to the Turks. An exhaustive story of court events and Despot Stefan's life follows, with numerous Biblical and classical references and numerous historical data which have proven invaluable to later historians. On several occasions, Constantine used acrostics, with three masterpiece instances: in the introduction verses, in the titles of central chapters, and in the verses telling of his sorrow for the deceased.

See also
Life of Stefan Nemanja
Life of St. Sava (by Domentijan)
Life of St. Sava (by Teodosije)

References

Sources

Further reading

External links 
 Житије деспота Стефана Лазаревића (excerpts), Project Rastko 

Medieval Serbian literature
15th century in Serbia
1430s books
Serbian Despotate
Lazarević dynasty
History of the Serbian Orthodox Church
Books about monarchs
15th-century history books
Serbian manuscripts
Cyrillic manuscripts
Christian hagiography
1431